Piriform, sometimes pyriform, means pear-shaped (from Latin pirum "pear" and forma "shape").

It may also refer to:

Going pear-shaped
 Going wrong or going pear-shaped

Anatomy 
 Piriform aperture, more commonly known as anterior nasal aperture
 Piriform cortex, a region in the brain
 Piriformis muscle, a gluteal muscle
 Piriformis syndrome, a neuromuscular disorder in which piriformis muscle compresses the sciatic nerve
 Piriform sinus, piriform recess or piriform fossa, synonyms referring to one of the four sites of the hypopharynx
 the pear female body shape

Other uses 
 Piriform (company), a software company
 Piriform, in hydrostatic equilibrium
 Pyriform, a teapot shape introduced in the 18th century